In the United States Army, soldiers may wear insignia to denote membership in a particular area of military specialism and series of functional areas. Army branch insignia is similar to the line officer and staff corps officer devices of the U.S. Navy as well as to the Navy enlisted rating badges. The Medical, Nurse, Dental, Veterinary, Medical Service, Medical Specialist, Chaplains, and Judge Advocate General's Corps are considered "special branches", while the others are "basic branches".

Army branch insignia is separate from Army qualification badges in that qualification badges require completion of a training course or school, whereas branch insignia is issued to a service member upon assignment to a particular area of the Army.

History
The first use of Army branch insignia was just prior to the American Civil War in 1859 for use on the black felt hat. A system of branch colors, indicated by piping on uniforms of foot soldiers and lace for mounted troops, was first authorized in the 1851 uniform regulations, with Prussian blue denoting infantry, scarlet for artillery, orange for dragoons, green for mounted rifles, and black for staff. When the U.S. Army began developing a series of colored rank epaulets for wear by officers of various Army branches, the scheme included yellow for cavalry officers, red for artillery officers, and light blue or white for infantry officers. General officers wore dark blue epaulets, whilst doctors wore green.

By the start of the 20th century, Army personnel began wearing various branch insignia on the stand-up collars of the Army dress uniform. Branch insignia was also worn by officers on the wool uniform shirt when worn as outerwear. Enlisted soldiers wore a version enclosed in a brass disk while officers wore a full sized version not enclosed. This has continued to the modern age.

Members of Infantry, Armor (including Cavalry), Special Forces, Aviation, Engineer, Field Artillery and Air Defense Artillery regiments may wear a version of the insignia in which the regimental number is included in the insignia. For Air Defense Artillery and Aviation, the number is mounted on the center of the face. For Infantry, Cavalry, Special Forces and Field Artillery, the number is placed immediately above, but not covering, the intersection of the crossed rifles, sabres, arrows, or cannon, respectively. For Armor, the number is placed immediately above the tank.

Branch insignia for Soldiers not affiliated with an infantry, armor, field artillery, air defense artillery, cavalry, special forces, or aviation regiment, generally wear their assigned basic branch insignia; however, as an option, Soldiers who are not affiliated with one of the above regiments, but who are assigned to a color-bearing regiment or separate operational battalion of their branch, may wear their branch insignia with the numerical designation of the battalion or regiment affixed, when approved by the Army command (ACOM) commander, Army service component command commander, or Army direct reporting unit commander. Officers and enlisted personnel assigned to cavalry regiments, cavalry squadrons, or separate cavalry troops are authorized to wear cavalry collar insignia in lieu of the branch insignia, when approved by the ACOM commander.

Certain special assignment insignia is worn in place of branch insignia to denote the officer's or NCO's particular responsibility. The enlisted versions of these are borne on a golden disk in the same manner as their customary branch device. Officers so assigned continue to wear their basic branch colors on the epaulets of the blue Army Service Uniform and the Army Blue Mess uniform.
 Officers and NCOs serving a term in an Inspector General billet wear Inspector General insignia.
 Officers assigned to general staff billets wear General Staff insignia.
 Officers assigned as aides-de-camp wear aide-de-camp insignia which denotes the rank of the officer or official whom they serve.
 Nominative sergeants major will wear nominative Senior Enlisted Leader collar insignia (previously referred to as command sergeant major insignia or enlisted branch immaterial insignia) worn by command sergeants major and sergeants major when in a position rated by a general officer or senior executive service level civilian.
 The sergeant major assigned as the Sergeant Major of the Army wears unique insignia based upon that of an aide-de-camp to the Army Chief of Staff.
 If the Senior Enlisted Advisor to the Chairman is selected from the Army, that sergeant major wears unique insignia based upon that of an aide-de-camp to the Chairman of the Joint Chiefs of Staff.

From 1920, warrant officers, being appointed into the Army "at large", wore the warrant officer device rather than branch insignia on their lapels and a larger warrant officer device on the service cap. Likewise, they wore brown as a branch color no matter their basic specialty. In 2004, warrant officers adopted the insignia and colors of the branch corresponding to their specialty and began wearing the officer insignia on the service cap.

Aside from Army custom, the Army Chief of Staff, former Chiefs of Staff, and generals of the Army (five-star) may prescribe their branch insignia. All other general officers may wear branch insignia at their option. If they choose this option, general officers will wear the branch insignia for the position to which they are appointed, or for their duty assignment. Army custom is that general officers wear no branch insignia, as they deal with echelons far above the basic branch level. Exceptions, however exist, as with the commandants of the various branches retain the respective insignia and Dean of the U.S. Military Academy wears the Professor, USMA insignia.

Wear of Insignia
The 21st century Army displays branch insignia on the blue Army Service Uniform coats; it was similarly worn on the Army Green uniform coat until that uniform was withdrawn from wear in 2015.   Branch insignia was also similarly worn on rarely seen Army White uniform coat prior to that uniform being declared obsolete and unauthorized in 2006. Enlisted soldiers wear the branch insignia disk on the wearer's left coat collar, opposite the "U.S." insignia disk. All officers, apart from most general officers, wear branch insignia on both lapels, beneath the "U.S." insignia on both coat lapels. Most general officers wear only the "U.S." insignia on both coat lapels, and no branch insignia; chaplains, judge advocates, and senior branch chiefs such as the Chief Engineer and the Quartermaster General are exceptions to this custom, and wear branch insignia in the same manner as typical officers. Other branch chiefs (i.e.:  Chief of Infantry, Chief of Artillery, Chief of Intelligence, etc.) may at their option wear the insignia of their branch as other officers; similarly, the Inspector General and Deputy Inspector General wear the inspector general insignia on their lapels in the same manner as other officers serving on inspector general tours.

Branch insignia is also worn by commissioned and warrant officers on the left collar of the hospital duty uniform and the arctic fatigues; rank is worn on the right collar.  Chaplains wear branch insignia above the right breast pocket of Class B shirts; no other personnel wear branch insignia on Class B uniforms. Similarly, chaplains are the only soldiers who wear branch insignia on the Army Combat Uniform; chaplains also wear branch insignia on helmets and patrol caps in the place of rank insignia.

Branch of service insignia
The following are the current branch insignia emblems of the United States Army:

Aide-de-camp and senior enlisted advisors
Although not considered a branch of service, U.S. Army officers assigned as aides to flag or equivalent grade officers replace their branch of service insignia for a special aide-de-camp insignia that denote the grade or position of the officer the aide supports.  Because these collar insignia are branch immaterial, officers continue to wear their original branch of service colors and Army Regimental System insignia.

Army Command Sergeants Major holding the rank/position of Sergeant Major of the Army and Senior Enlisted Advisor to the Chairman of the Joint Chiefs of Staff replace their Command Sergeant Major/Branch Immaterial insignia with a unique insignia that replicates the shield of the Aide-de-camp insignia to the Army Chief of Staff and Aide-de-camp insignia to the Chairman of the Joint Chiefs of Staff respectively.  These shields are superimposed on top of a gold disk, which is traditional for all enlisted branch of service insignia.

Obsolete insignia
The following insignia are no longer used:

See also
 Heraldry
 List of United States Navy staff corps

References

External links

 Branch Insignia

Heraldry of the United States Army
United States military specialty insignia